Geoffrey Smith (born 1943, Michigan) is a British-based American radio presenter, author and former jazz percussionist. Smith was the regular presenter of BBC Radio 3's Jazz Record Requests for over twenty years and has also presented other programmes on the network.

Biography
Smith's father was a pianist who also played banjo in his local dance-band in Detroit. Smith's own active jazz career ended in 1969, discouraged by the rise of rock music. In 1973 he came to Britain to complete a PhD, where he began a new career as a freelance journalist and lecturer, contributing articles and reviews to Country Life, New Society and The Spectator among others. He remains a regular contributor to Country Life and The Economist, for whom he writes on music and other cultural subjects.

His first book, published in 1983, was a survey of the Savoy Opera.  His biography of Stéphane Grappelli followed in 1987. In 1988 he adapted the Grappelli book into a series for BBC Radio 3, the first of his many broadcasts for the network. In 1991, on the death of Peter Clayton, he became the regular presenter of Jazz Record Requests until 2012 when Alyn Shipton took over as the presenter. A new series hosted by Smith, Geoffrey Smith's Jazz, began on 6 May 2012 and ran until 27 October 2019.

Books 
 The Savoy Operas: A New Guide to Gilbert and Sullivan, March 1985, Universe Pub, 
 Stéphane Grappelli: A Biography, 1987, Michael Joseph,

References

External links 
 BBC profile

1943 births
BBC Radio 3 presenters
British non-fiction writers
British radio personalities
Living people
British male writers
Male non-fiction writers